Crassispira sandrogorii is a species of sea snail, a marine gastropod mollusc in the family Pseudomelatomidae.

Description
The length of the shell attains 13 mm. Most species in this genus have a tall spire and a truncated anterior canal. The ribs are overridden by spirals, forming beads or nodules. Under the subsutural keel is the sinus area rather smooth.

The small shell is subclavate and tuberculated. The spire is thick and, lengthened. The outer lip shows a slight sinus above and is thickened internally at the top and the bottom. The top of the inner lip has a thick pad. The basal channel is slightly defined.

Distribution
This species occurs in the Atlantic Ocean off São Tomé y Principe.

References

 Ryall, P., Horro, J. & Rolàn, E., 2009. Two new species of Crassispira (Gastropoda, Conoidea) from West Africa with a taxonomic note on Crassispira tripter von Maltzan, 1883. Iberus 27(1): 131-139

External links
 

sandrogorii

Gastropods described in 2009